Paea Wolfgramm (born December 1, 1969) is a Tongan retired boxer.  Nicknamed "The Tongan Warrior", Wolfgramm won the Super Heavyweight silver medal at the 1996 Summer Olympics, making him the first athlete from Tonga to win an Olympic medal.

Personal
Wolfgramm has 7 children - 5 boys and 2 girls, as well as 4 brothers and 2 sisters. He resides in South Auckland New Zealand, where he is a hostel parent at a well-known New Zealand school, Wesley College.

Amateur highlights 
1994 3rd place at the Commonwealth Games in Victoria, Canada.
Defeated Joseph Saimei (Solomon Islands) RSC 2
Lost to David Anyim (Kenya) PTS (5-9)
1995 won the Oceanian Championships in Nuku'alofa, Tonga.
1996 Representing Tonga, Wolfgramm won the Super Heavyweight Silver Medal at the Atlanta Olympics. Results were:
Defeated Serguei Lyakhovich (Belarus) PTS (10-9)
Defeated Alexis Rubalcaba (Cuba) PTS (17-12)
Defeated Duncan Dokiwari (Nigeria) PTS (7-6)
Lost to Wladimir Klitschko (Ukraine) PTS (3-7)

Professional career
At 6'4" and 325 pounds, the huge Wolfgramm turned pro after the Olympics, but had limited success.  He lost a decision to journeyman Marion Wilson in 1998. Although he was able to beat former Cuban Olympian Jorge Luis Gonzalez by decision to set up a fight with Wladimir Klitschko for the vacant WBC International Heavyweight Title, he was beaten in the first round in a rematch of their 1996 Super Heavyweight Olympic finals bout. He later lost a decision to Eliecer Castillo, but beat Jimmy Thunder to set up a fight with Corey Sanders in late 2001. Sanders won via 9th-round TKO, and Wolfgramm announced his retirement shortly after this fight.

Professional boxing record

Honours
National honours
  Order of Queen Sālote Tupou III, Member (31 July 2008).

References

External links
 

1969 births
Living people
Tongan male boxers
Heavyweight boxers
Super-heavyweight boxers
Olympic boxers of Tonga
Olympic silver medalists for Tonga
Olympic medalists in boxing
Boxers at the 1996 Summer Olympics
Medalists at the 1996 Summer Olympics
Commonwealth Games bronze medallists for Tonga
Commonwealth Games medallists in boxing
Boxers at the 1994 Commonwealth Games
People from Vavaʻu
Tongan emigrants to New Zealand
Tongan people of German descent
Members of the Order of Queen Sālote Tupou III
Medallists at the 1994 Commonwealth Games